Pinga is an Inuit goddess of the hunt, fertility and medicine.

Pinga or Pingas may also refer to:

Beverages 
 Cachaça, a distilled sugarcane beverage popular in Brazil

People 
 Artur Pinga (1909–1963), Portuguese footballer
 Pinga (footballer, born 1924) (1924–1996), full name José Lázaro Robles, Brazilian football midfielder
 Pinga (footballer, born 1965), full name Jorge Luis da Silva Brum, Brazilian football defender
 Pinga (footballer, born 1981), full name André Luciano da Silva, Brazilian football attacking midfielder

Television 
 Pinga, the younger sister of the title character of Pingu

Other 
 Pinga, a Central African throwing knife
 Pinga, a song from the Bollywood movie Bajirao Mastani
 Pinga, a slang term for MDMA
 Pinga (Democratic Republic of the Congo), a village in North Kivu, Democratic Republic of the Congo

See also
 Pingo (disambiguation)